Ivan Belytskyi (ukr. Іван Белицький, born 25 October 1936) is a Ukrainian middle-distance runner. He competed in the men's 1500 metres at the 1964 Summer Olympics, representing the Soviet Union.

References

External links
 

1936 births
Living people
Athletes (track and field) at the 1964 Summer Olympics
Ukrainian male middle-distance runners
Soviet male middle-distance runners
Olympic athletes of the Soviet Union
Place of birth missing (living people)